Harlekijn is the  Dutch record label of Herman van Veen. it was established in 1968.

The label is distributed by Polydor.

Discography
1973 	Herman van Veen 	Carré / Amsterdam "Zo Leren Kijken"
1974 	Joost Nuissl 	        Een huis van zachte steenen
1974 	Herman van Veen 	En nooit weerom 
1975 	Reinbert de Leeuw 	Early Pianoworks, Volume One
1975 	Toyohiko Satoh 	        Barok-luitrecital 				
1975 	Harry Sacksioni 	Harry Sacksioni: Gitaar
1976 	Herman van Veen 	Amsterdam Carré III
1976 	Erik van der Wurff 	Heimwee naar de herfst
1976 	Arnold Schoenberg 	Serenade Opus 24 / Suite Opus 29 (Schoenberg Ens. - Reinbert de Leeuw)
1976 	Reinbert de Leeuw 	Early Pianoworks Volume 2 			
1976 	Harry Sacksioni 	Vensters
1976 	Erik Satie 	        Mélodies - Marjanne Kweksilber - Reinbert de Leeuw 	
1977 	Herman van Veen 	Overblijven
1977 	Het Nederlands Blazers Ensemble / Reinbert de Leeuw / Vera Beths 	Ballet Mécanique; A Jazz Symphony; Violin Sonata 1 & 2
1977 	Luk Bral 	        Het tedere geweld
1977 	Loeki Knol 	        Op goed geluk			
1977 	Lucy Steymel 	        Gift From a Stranger
1978 	Harry Sacksioni 	Amsterdam 	
1978 	Herman van Veen 	Gezongen (10 jaar Herman van Veen) 	
1978 	Herman van Veen 	Op handen 	
1978 	Harry Sacksioni 	Om de hoek 
1979 	Harry Sacksioni 	Het dubbelleven van Holle Vijnman / Prikklok 07.45 uur 	
1979 	Herman van Veen 	De wonderlijke avonturen van Herman van Veen
1979 	Herman van Veen 	Een voorstelling Carré IV
1979 	Herman van Veen 	Kerstliederen
1979 	Herman van Veen 	Kerstliederen
1979 	Herman van Veen 	Uit elkaar
1979 	Herman van Veen 	Opzij / Liefdeslied
1980 	Herman Finkers 	        Vinger in de bips / Raquel van Welch
1980 	Harry Sacksioni 	Das Doppelleben von Holle Fijnmann
1980 	Harry Sacksioni 	Het Dubbelleven van Holle Vijnman
1980 	Herman van Veen 	Brons (Verzamelde liedjes na 1975)
1980 	Harry Sacksioni 	Live in Amsterdam 
1981 	Harry Sacksioni 	Suikerspin / Marco Polo			
1981 	Harry Sacksioni 	Ganz persönlich
1981 	Johnny the Selfkicker 	Oorlog en Pap, deel 1 (In razende vaart door de geschiedenis)	
1981 	Harry Sacksioni 	Strikt Persoonlijk
1982 	Harry Sacksioni 	Gitaren
1982 	Herman van Veen 	Iets van een clown
1982 	Erik van der Wurff 	Van de koele meren des doods
1984 	Harry Sacksioni 	Nachtjournaal
1984 	Herman van Veen 	Signalen
1984 	Herman van Veen 	Signalen
1984 	Herman van Veen 	Het een en ander
1986 	Herman van Veen 	Anne
1987 	Herman van Veen 	Kerstliederen
1988 	RO Theater 	        Hoogtepunten Uit de Rotterdamse Opera Pol 
1989 	Herman van Veen 	Rode wangen 
1989 	Herman van Veen 	Suzanne / Zo vrolijk 			
1993 	Herman van Veen 	Voor wie anders
2001 	Herman van Veen & The Rosenberg Trio 	Tes bisous sont plus doux
2004 	Lori Spee 	        The First Lady
2005 	Babette van Veen 	Winter
2009 	Herman van Veen 	Im Augenblick
2009 	Herman van Veen 	2 for 1 - 11 - Die seltsamen Abenteuer des Herman van Veen / Liederbuch 				
2014 	Edith Leerkes 	        Liedjes

See also
 List of record labels

External links
 Official Site
 discography at Rateyourmusic.com

Dutch record labels
Record labels established in 1968